The Parti des travailleurs du Québec fielded nineteen candidates in the 1989 Quebec provincial election, none of whom were elected.

Candidates

Rosemont: Régis Beaulieu
Régis Beaulieu received 256 votes (0.92%), finishing sixth against Liberal incumbent Guy Rivard.

References

Candidates in Quebec provincial elections